Pygoda irrorata is a species of stink bug in the family Pentatomidae found in South America. It was first described as Edessa irrorata by William Dallas in 1851 and renamed under genus Pygoda in 2018.

References

Pentatomidae
Insects described in 1851